The Baltimore County Police Department is the primary law enforcement agency for Baltimore County, Maryland. They have been accredited by Commission on Accreditation for Law Enforcement Agencies (C.A.L.E.A.) since 1984.

Police chief 
The current Chief of the county police department is Interim chief, Dennis Delp.

In March 2017, James Johnson retired. Terrence B. Sheridan returned to take over control of the police department until his departure in June 2019, when Melissa Hyatt assumed control of the police after being appointed by the County Executive, John A. Olszewski Jr.

History

The Baltimore County Police Department was established by the General Assembly of Maryland on April 11, 1874. The Maryland state legislature authorized the Board of County Commissioners for Baltimore County "to appoint such number of policemen as they may deem necessary, for the better protection of persons and property." On June 17, 1874, the County Commissioners divided the two mile (3 km) portion of the county bordering the Baltimore City boundary into five districts and appointed the first police force. Officers were appointed to one year terms. In 1878, County Commissioners were authorized to build their first station house at Waverly. The Canton Station was added a year later. New stations would be added and rebuilt in 1886, 1891, 1892, 1920, 1927, 1928, 1943, 1954, 1955, 1961, 1962, 1965, 1969, 1973, 1985, 1987, 1991, 2001, 2004, 2005, 2006, and 2007.

In 1883, a new position, "Marshal of Police", was created, and Charles O. Kemp was appointed to the office. This new position consolidated the responsibility and control of the police force under one person, instead of individual chiefs for each police district. 

In 1888, a  portion of Baltimore County was annexed by Baltimore City. The number of officers in the Baltimore County Police Department was cut from 33 to 10 as officers and station houses were absorbed into the Baltimore City Police Department on the western and northern "precincts" adjacent to the City. The heavily industrial and residential communities on the east such as Highlandtown and Canton voted against annexation in the referendum and stayed in the county until 1919, when another  of suburban and rural Baltimore County was annexed, causing the B.C.o.P.D. to lose 34 of its 43 officers to the city police force.

In 1902, the Maryland General Assembly passed an act aimed at ensuring that officers appointed to the Baltimore County police force would be qualified. The act required every applicant to provide their full name and age, location of birth, and prior occupations in the last two years, among other details. Applicants could not be younger than 21 years old or older than 45. It also required four "reputable" citizens of the county to speak of the applicant's character and affirm that they would be "fit for service".

The first woman was appointed to the county police force in 1913 as a matron. Two other women, Eva Aldridge and Ruth Jones were appointed to summer positions as Special Officers to protect young girls at the river resorts along the Patapsco River, Back River and Middle River in the eastern part of the county along the Chesapeake Bay. B.C.o.P.D.'s first female officer to become a Major was appointed in 1976, and in 1995, the force had its first female Colonel.

The B.C.o.P.D.'s Bureau of Identification was established in 1927. Its main purpose was to classify fingerprints and photographs which would serve as an aid in solving crime. In 1940, a plain clothes unit was established and trained to handle criminal investigations.

In 1947, a fire at the B.C.o.P.D.'s Towson Station killed two prisoners being held in the lockup, despite efforts by officers to pull the bars out of the windows using a tow truck.

In 1952, the first Black/African-American patrol officers, Armond Elliott, Frances Jackson, and James Johnson, were appointed to the county force, and in 1976, the first female officer was promoted to the rank of Major. Additionally, a Black officer was promoted to the rank of Lieutenant for the first time in 1981, and the first Black officer to become Colonel was promoted in 1995.

B.C.o.P.D.'s Police-Community Relations Council was established in 1983, and, in 1984, the first Child Abuse Unit in the state of Maryland was established in Baltimore County. In the same year, the B.Co.P.D. became the first major department in the country to be awarded national accreditation. The department's Citizen's Police Academy was developed in 1993.

In 2002, B.C.o.P.D. joined the CODIS database allowing it to share and access DNA information to identify suspects.
In the same year, it was re-accredited by the Commission on Accreditation of Law Enforcement Agencies (CALEA).
Additionally, the computer crime unit and its mission were expanded and renamed the Digital and Multimedia Evidence Unit.

In 2006, the Gang Enforcement Team was created to fight growth of gangs in the County, and in 2007, the Violent Crime Unit was created to investigate non-fatal shootings and other serious assaults.

Criticism 
The Baltimore County Police Department has faced criticism, mainly due to its lack of diversity and the history of its officers fatally harming citizens.

White people are the majority in the force, accounting for 80%, whereas the percentage of White people in Baltimore County as a whole is 57%. In particular, White males are the department's largest demographic. In August 2019, the US Department of Justice filed a lawsuit against the B.C.o.P.D. concerning discriminatory practices on their entry-level hiring examinations. The design of the exams allegedly made it more difficult for minorities to pass, as seen by the significantly lower amount of Black applicants who passed. A settlement was reached between the police department and the Department of Justice, and as a result, the exams were discontinued and plans were made to hire twenty of the Black applicants who did not pass the exams but were otherwise qualified.

Precincts
Formerly known as "police stations", since the 1970s Baltimore County has been divided into ten police precincts.  Number 5 is intentionally skipped and will be used if the department needs to expand at a later time.  Most recently, this happened in 2006 when Precinct 4 opened in Pikesville and Precinct 3 moved from Garrison to Franklin.  Former Precincts 10 (Fullerton) and 13 (Edgemere) were absorbed into Precincts 9 and 12, respectively.

 Precinct 1 -  Wilkens (Arbutus, Baltimore Highlands, Catonsville area)
 Precinct 2 -  Woodlawn
 Precinct 3 -  Franklin (Owings, Mills, Reisterstown area)
 Precinct 4 -  Pikesville
 Precinct 6 -  Towson
 Precinct 7 -  Cockeysville
 Precinct 8 -  Parkville
 Precinct 9 -  White Marsh
 Precinct 11 - Essex
 Precinct 12 - Dundalk

Fleet

The primary patrol vehicles used are the Ford Taurus, Ford Interceptor Utility and some remaining Crown Victorias. Specialized units such as SWAT, Crash Team, and K9 use Chevy Suburbans, while Marine Unit has a few Ford F250s in use. Both Dodge and Chevrolet vans are used for prisoner transport and the Commercial Vehicle unit. Motorcycle units ride Harley-Davidson Road Kings.
The department recently placed 3 new Eurocopter AS350B3 helicopters into service.

In early 2014, the department announced that they would begin to phase out the aging & discontinued Ford Crown Victoria with new Ford Taurus police interceptors. Beginning sometime between fall 2018 and early 2019, Baltimore County Police will replace all remaining Crown Victorias and older Tauruses with the Ford Explorer Police Interceptor Utility. The new Explorers are expected to be on the road by early 2019. As of September, 2018, the VOM Shop Located in Hunt Valley has started to receive the first 250 Explorers and are being outfitted to be on the street by 2019.

New for Baltimore County, patrol vehicles are now being equipped with “cruise lights”, the steady burning red and blue lights on the light bars commonly seen on Baltimore City, MTA and MSP vehicles. This addition is to further allow officers to maintain high visibility in areas prone to criminal activity. These lights can be turned on and off at the operators discretion.

Weapons
The primary duty firearm is the Glock 17 chambered in 9mm issued with Ameriglo 3 dot night sights, and a TLR-7 weapon mounted light. The Remington 870 shotgun is issued to every marked patrol car, except specialized units like K9, BPI, and the Traffic units/Crash Team to name a few. Axon T7 Tasers, and Less Lethal beanbag shotguns AR-15 patrol rifles as well as M16 patrol rifles are issued to some specifically trained officers. All officers are issued OC spray and an ASP baton. Officers working in a uniformed capacity excluding Tactical (SWAT) are issued Axon Flex 2 Body Cameras and issued phones linked to them.

The 870s, some of which date back to the 1980s, are slated for an upgrade that includes their own mounted lights, rails for optics, ghost ring sights and retractable stocks.

In October 2018, after significant review of the performance and reliability history of the FNS-40LS, the Baltimore County Police Department will be transitioning to the Glock 17 chambered in 9mm starting January 2019 and span over a two month transition period.

Prior to the FNS-40LS officers were armed with the SIG Pro SP2340 in .40 S&W, prior to the SP2340 was the SIG-Sauer P226, after the transition in the 90s from S&W Model 10 Revolvers.

Rank structure and insignia
The Baltimore County Police Department rank structure is as listed:

See also

 List of law enforcement agencies in Maryland

References

External links
  Official Website
 

County police departments of Maryland
Baltimore County, Maryland
1874 establishments in Maryland